Christi Michelle Thomas (born August 14, 1982) played professional basketball in the WNBA. She attended the University of Georgia where she played under coach Andy Landers. She has been a professional since 2004. Christi also played basketball at Buford High School in Buford, Georgia, where she led the Buford Wolves to a State Runner-Up finish in 1999. She's 6 ft 5 in (1.91 m) and weighs 185 lb (84 kg). On January 30, 2009 Thomas was traded to the Minnesota Lynx for Vanessa Hayden-Johnson.

WNBA career statistics

Regular season

|-
| align="left" | 2004
| align="left" | Los Angeles
| 31 || 8 || 17.6 || .462 || .455 || .683 || 3.9 || 0.7 || 0.6 || 0.5 || 0.9 || 5.3
|-
| align="left" | 2005
| align="left" | Los Angeles
| 32 || 0 || 16.3 || .500 || .333 || .688 || 3.3 || 0.5 || 0.3 || 0.6 || 0.8 || 3.8
|-
| align="left" | 2006
| align="left" | Los Angeles
| 27 || 1 || 20.0 || .489 || .200 || .638 || 5.3 || 1.0 || 0.7 || 0.5 || 1.6 || 6.1
|-
| align="left" | 2007
| align="left" | Los Angeles
| 34 || 19 || 18.8 || .481 || .353 || .757 || 5.3 || 0.5 || 0.6 || 0.3 || 1.4 || 8.4
|-
| align="left" | 2008
| align="left" | Los Angeles
| 20 || 0 || 8.0 || .353 || .167 || .500 || 2.0 || 0.3 || 0.1 || 0.4 || 0.4 || 1.5
|-
| align="left" | 2009
| align="left" | Minnesota
| 11 || 0 || 6.0 || .048 || .000 || .500 || 1.4 || 0.3 || 0.3 || 0.5 || 0.5 || 0.3
|-
| align="left" | 2010
| align="left" | Chicago
| 15 || 0 || 8.5 || .400 || .000 || .500 || 1.7 || 0.1 || 0.1 || 0.2 || 0.5 || 1.3
|-
| align="left" | Career
| align="left" | 7 years, 3 teams
| 170 || 28 || 15.3 || .459 || .270 || .684 || 3.7 || 0.6 || 0.5 || 0.4 || 0.9 || 4.6

Playoffs

|-
| align="left" | 2004
| align="left" | Los Angeles
| 3 || 3 || 33.3 || .545 || .000 || .000 || 7.7 || 0.7 || 0.3 || 0.3 || 0.7 || 8.0
|-
| align="left" | 2005
| align="left" | Los Angeles
| 2 || 0 || 19.0 || .750 || 1.000 || 1.000 || 1.0 || 1.0 || 0.0 || 1.0 || 1.0 || 4.0
|-
| align="left" | 2006
| align="left" | Los Angeles
| 5 || 0 || 21.4 || .545 || .667 || .800 || 3.2 || 0.8 || 0.6 || 1.2 || 0.2 || 6.0
|-
| align="left" | Career
| align="left" | 3 years, 1 team
| 10 || 3 || 24.5 || .563 || .600 || .833 || 4.1 || 0.8 || 0.4 || 0.9 || 0.5 || 6.2

Georgia  statistics
Source

References

External links
Sparks trades Thomas to the Lynx for Hayden-Johnson

1982 births
Living people
American women's basketball players
Basketball players from Marietta, Georgia
Centers (basketball)
Chicago Sky players
Georgia Lady Bulldogs basketball players
Los Angeles Sparks draft picks
Los Angeles Sparks players
Maccabi Bnot Ashdod B.C. players
Minnesota Lynx players
People from Buford, Georgia